Madhumitha is a Tamil film director.

Career
Madhumita was born in Chennai, Tamil Nadu, India and grew up in Indonesia. She later moved to Singapore for college and did her master's degree in Los Angeles, US.

During her stay in Singapore she made several short films, one of which won the best of the world category in BBC and she was honoured with the Singapore Student Award. In USA, she briefly worked with the Pirates of the Caribbean team before returning to Chennai to become a film director.

Her debut film was the romantic drama Vallamai Tharayo starring R. Parthipan and Chaya Singh. In spite of mixed reviews, with Sify calling her direction "amateurish", the film completed a 100 days-run at the box office  and won the Tamil Nadu State Film Award for Best Family Film in 2008. According to Madhumitha, the film was also screened at various international film festivals including the Newport Beach Film Festival in Los Angeles. Her second film was the comedy flick Kola Kolaya Mundhirika, which was co-written by Crazy Mohan. After a five-years hiatus, 2015 will see the release of her next projects, the bilingual romantic comedies, Moone Moonu Varthai (Tamil) / Moodu Mukkallo Cheppalante.

Filmography
All films are in Tamil, unless otherwise noted.

References

External links
 

Tamil film directors
Living people
Film directors from Chennai
Indian women film directors
21st-century Indian film directors
Telugu film directors
Tamil screenwriters
Indian women screenwriters
Screenwriters from Chennai
Women artists from Tamil Nadu
21st-century Indian women artists
Year of birth missing (living people)